Laurenzana is a town and comune in the province of Potenza, in the region of Basilicata (southern Italy). It rises on a spur between the torre Camastro and the wood surrounding the Serrapotamo valley.

History
Laurenzana's origins probably date from the 12th century when the Normans decided to build a fortified village in this area due to its strategic position.  In 1268 Laurenzana took part in the Ghibelline revolt against Pope Clement IV.  During the Aragonese domination, it was ruled by the Orsini del Balzo and then in the 15th century by the Loffredos followed by the Filangieris the De Ruggieros, the De Quartos and the Belgioiosos.

Main sights

The ruins of the 12th to 13th-century Laurenzana Castle are found on a crag atop the village. 

The Chiesa Madre dell'Assunta with a stone portal dating from 1780 is the main church. It has a polychrome marble main altar, and a 16th-century fresco along with 18th-century Neapolitan school altarpieces.

Near the Assunta there is a belvedere from which it is possible to view the surrounding valleys and mountains. The Società Botanica Italiana has considered the Abetina as a biotope of extraordinary environmental interest and has designated it a "Riserva Naturale Regionale".

The Church of the Madonna del Carmine houses a 1611 canvas painted by Giovanni Battista Serra from Tricarico.

Economy
Up to a few years ago, Laurenzana was famous for the production of high quality liquors produced in four distilleries situated within the village.  Handicraft activities regarding the manufacture of wooden barrels, bagpipes and wrought-iron were also widespread.  The economy of the village is mainly based on agriculture; in fact, it is possible to find silviculture and animal breeding farms producing delicious dairy products.

Religious festivals
Beato Egidio da Laurenzana: January 10 (date of birth); Last Sunday in May or First Sunday in June
Sant'Antonio di Padova : June 13
San Vito : June 15
Madonna del Carmelo : July 16
San Rocco : August 16
Madonna Addolorata : Last Sunday in September

Typical local dishes
Calzone ripieno con salame. (Calzone filled with salame)
Gnocchi con le rape. (Gnocchi with turnips)
Pane di grano duro cotto al forno (Durum wheat bread cooked in an oven)
Sauzezz r laurnzn (Traditional sausages)
Patate chiene (Filled potatoes)
Nuglia (Lean sausages)

Demographic
Population census

Twin towns
 Barberino di Mugello, Italy

See also
Gaetani dell'Aquila d'Aragona, princes of Piedimonte, and dukes of Laurenzana
Teresa de Francisci, born Maria "Mary" Teresa Cafarelli; is best known for being the model for the depiction of Liberty on the obverse of the Peace Dollar, which was designed by her husband Anthony de Francisci.

References

External links
Laurenzana Genealogy(Births, Marriage index 1809-1910, Deaths)(Archived)

Cities and towns in Basilicata